The 2005 FIBA Africa Championship was the 23rd FIBA Africa Championship, played under the rules of FIBA, the world governing body for basketball, and the FIBA Africa thereof. The tournament was hosted by Algeria from August 15 to 24 2005 and took place at the Salle Omnisports La Coupole.

Angola defeated Senegal 70–61 in the final to win their eighth title. and securing a spot at the 2008 Summer Olympics.

Squads

Draw

Preliminary round 
Times given below are in UTC+1.

Group A

Group B

Knockout stage

9-12th place bracket

9-12th place

11th place match

9th place match

5-8th place bracket

5-8th place

7th place match

5th place match

Championship bracket

Quarterfinals

Semifinals

Bronze medal match

Final

Final standings

Awards

All-Tournament Team 
  Miguel Lutonda
  Olímpio Cipriano
  Ime Udoka
  Abdelhalim Sayah
  Boniface Ndong

Statistical Leaders

Individual Tournament Highs 

Points

Rebounds

Assists

Steals

Blocks

Minutes

Individual Game Highs

Team Tournament Highs 

Points per Game

Total Points

Rebounds

Assists

Steals

Blocks

2-point field goal percentage

3-point field goal percentage

Free throw percentage

Team Game highs

See also 
 2005 FIBA Africa Clubs Champions Cup

External links 
 Official Website

References 

 
2005 in African basketball
2005 in Algerian sport
AfroBasket
August 2005 sports events in Africa
International basketball competitions hosted by Algeria